The 2012 Tajik Football Super Cup was the 3rd Tajik Supercup match, a football match which was contested between the 2011 League champions, Istiklol, and the Cup champions, Regar-TadAZ.

Match details

See also
2011 Tajik League
2011 Tajik Cup

References

Super Cup
Tajik Supercup